Gracixalus medogensis, also known as the Medog bubble-nest frog or Medog small treefrog, is a species of shrub frog, family Rhacophoridae. As currently known, it is endemic to the Mêdog County in southern Tibet, although its distribution might extend into the adjacent Arunachal Pradesh, northeastern India.

Description
The body is slender. The tympanum is distinct. The fingers and toes have well-developed discs. The toes have basal webbing. Adult males have nuptial pads only on the first finger. Linea masculina is present. The venter is light grey or whitish.

Habitat and conservation
Specimens have been found on the shrubs along the shore of a lake deep in the forest, possibly in its breeding habitat. It is a rare species that until recently was only known from a single specimen. Because of ongoing decline in the extent and quality of its habitat, it is suspected that its overall population is decreasing. Road construction is a specific threat. It is found in the Yarlung Zangbo Grand Canyon National Nature Reserve.

Notes

References

medogensis
Frogs of China
Endemic fauna of Tibet
Amphibians described in 1984